Allison Howell Williams (born April 13, 1988) is an American actress. Following several minor roles in television, she played Marnie Michaels in the HBO comedy-drama series Girls (2012–2017), which earned her a Critics' Choice Award nomination. After playing the titular role in Peter Pan Live! (2014), she earned several accolades for starring as Rose Armitage in the horror film Get Out (2017). She has since appeared as Kit Snicket in the series A Series of Unfortunate Events (2017–2019) and starred as Gemma in the horror film M3GAN (2022).

Early life
Williams was born and raised in New Canaan, Connecticut, the daughter of former NBC Nightly News anchor and managing editor Brian Williams and TV producer Jane Gillan Stoddard. She has a brother, Doug, three years her junior. Williams attended New Canaan Country School and Greenwich Academy. She later attended Yale University majoring in English; she was a member of Morse College and the St. Elmo secret society.

While in New Canaan, Williams worked in a Ralph Lauren outlet store. She was also a member of the improv comedy troupe Just Add Water for four years and acted in the YouTube series College Musical. The project featured Sam Tsui and was directed by Kurt Hugo Schneider, both of whom attended Yale. She graduated with a degree in English in 2010.

Career 
In 2010, Williams performed a mashup of "Nature Boy" set to RJD2's "A Beautiful Mine", the theme song for the television series Mad Men. The YouTube video of the performance received widespread praise on the Internet. Judd Apatow subsequently cast Williams in the HBO series Girls, which premiered on April 15, 2012, generating universal praise from television critics. In 2016, Williams received a nomination for the Critics' Choice Television Award for Best Supporting Actress in a Comedy Series.

From 2011 to 2012, Williams appeared as Cheryl in the CollegeHumor series Jake and Amir. On December 4, 2014, she starred in the title role on NBC's live television presentation of the musical Peter Pan Live!, opposite Christopher Walken as Captain Hook.

In November 2016, Williams appeared in Past Forward, a short film collaboration between David O. Russell and Prada. Williams wrote a series of Funny or Die sketches starring as newlywed Kate Middleton, with English actor and model Oliver Jackson-Cohen as Prince William, Duke of Cambridge.

In 2017, Williams starred in the horror film Get Out. Director Jordan Peele was convinced she was right for the role of Rose after seeing her performance in Peter Pan Live!. Peele cast her in a role made to "disorient audiences",<ref>{{Cite web |date=December 1, 2017 |title=What White People Won't Accept Re: 'Get Outs Rose Armitage |url=https://www.themarysue.com/allison-williams-seth-meyers-get-out/ |website=The Mary Sue |language=en-US |access-date=October 12, 2021}}</ref> and Williams later said "I was looking for a role that would weaponize everything that people take for granted about me. So I instantly signed on to it." The film received critical acclaim, and the performances of the acting ensemble and Williams were praised, earning her several awards and nominations, including being nominated for the MTV Award for Best Villain and the Screen Actors Guild Award for Outstanding Performance by a Cast in a Motion Picture.

Williams was cast in the role of Charlotte on the Netflix horror film, The Perfection, which was released on May 24, 2019 to positive reviews, and her performance was called "compelling". She was cast in the role of Kit Snicket throughout the second and third seasons of the Netflix comedy-drama series A Series of Unfortunate Events. Williams appeared in the Swedish thriller film Horizon Line, which released in 2020.

In 2020, Williams reteamed with Blumhouse Productions to executive produce and star in M3GAN. She plays Gemma, a roboticist and creator of the robot M3GAN. The film was released on January 6, 2023, to critical and commercial success. She will reprise the role in its sequel, M3GAN 2.0, set for release in 2025. She will star in the upcoming miniseries Fellow Travelers.

 Personal life 
Williams began dating Ricky Van Veen who is the co-founder of CollegeHumor, in 2011. They were engaged in 2014 and married on September 19, 2015, in a private ceremony in Saratoga, Wyoming. Tom Hanks officiated the ceremony. She and her husband then lived in the Chelsea neighborhood of Manhattan. On June 27, 2019, Van Veen and Williams released a joint statement announcing their separation.

In late 2019, Williams began dating German actor Alexander Dreymon. They met while filming Horizon Line''. In late 2021, they had a son. In December 2022, it was reported that the couple became engaged.

Filmography

Film

Television

Awards and nominations

References

External links

 

1988 births
Living people
21st-century American actresses
Actresses from Connecticut
American child actresses
American film actresses
American television actresses
American voice actresses
People from New Canaan, Connecticut
Yale College alumni